Kotla Vijaya Bhaskara Reddy (16 August 1920 – 27 September 2001) served as the chief minister of the Indian state of United Andhra Pradesh in 1983 and then from 1992 to 1994. Reddy was a member of the Indian National Congress and was elected to the Lok Sabha six times. Reddy also served as a Union cabinet Minister, along with serving on several parliamentary committees. He lost the 1999 elections and subsequently retired from active politics. Botanical Garden in Hyderabad is named after him.

Early life 
Reddy was born in the remote village of Laddagiri in the Kurnool district to the family of a landlord. He began his involvement in politics at Nandyal gram panchayat and eventually became involved in the national level. He studied for his B.A., at Besant Theosophical College, Madanapalle and his LL.B. at Madras Law College, in Madras, (Tamil Nadu) in 1947. While Reddy graduated law school, he rarely practiced law due to his political workload.

Personal life 
Reddy was married on 7 June 1950 to Smt. K. Shyamla Reddy. He had two sons and three daughters. His son, Kotla Jayasurya Prakasha Reddy, was a Member of Parliament representing Kurnool Parliamentary constituency for his second term. Reddy's interests included sports, games, and reading. He was the captain of his hockey and football teams at Besant Theosophical College in Madanapalli, Andhra Pradesh and Chairman of Andhra Pradesh Sports Council from 1967 to 1969. He improved infrastructure in the Kurnool District and developed farmland in his native village.

Political career 
Reddy represented several assembly constituencies in the district, but his major breakthrough came when he was elected as chairman of Zilla Parishad. He held several posts both in the Indian National Congress party and in central and state governments. He was the ninth chief minister in the undivided Andhra Pradesh. Reddy engaged ion value-based politics, and he remained respected even after losing his Chief Ministership to N. T. Rama Rao.  After his death, "Kisan ghat" was erected in his memory by the state government.

As a politician, Reddy was credited with starting 15 primary and secondary schools in villages throughout the Kurnool District in Andhra Pradesh. As Chief Minister, he was known for introducing a mid-day meal scheme in primary schools for children 6–11 years old in the state of Andhra Pradesh. He also became known for supplying rice at a highly subsidised rate of Rs 1.90 per kg for poor families. Reddy became MLA for the first time in 1955, but he was denied a ticket in 1962. Unlike other Chief Ministers, Reddy did not have any corruption charges brought against him.

Positions held 
Throughout his 44-year career, Reddy served in both local and national positions. His work included the following:

1955-61: Member, Andhra Pradesh Legislative Assembly Secretary, Congress Legislature Party, Andhra Pradesh
1955-61: Member, Public Accounts Committee
1959-67: Chairman, Zila Parishad, Kurnool
1961-62: Chairman, Public Accounts Committee
1962-64: General-Secretary, Pradesh Congress Committee (Indira) [P.C.C.(I)], Andhra Pradesh
1967-72: Member, Andhra Pradesh Legislative Council
1967-71: Minister, Co-operation, Major Irrigation and  Finance, Andhra Pradesh
1977: Elected to 6th Lok Sabha
1977-82: Member, Committee on Estimates
1980-81: President, P.C.C.(I), Andhra Pradesh
1980: Re-elected to 7th Lok Sabha (2nd term)
1982-83: Chief Minister, Andhra Pradesh
1983-84: Union Cabinet Minister, Shipping and Transport and Union Cabinet Minister, Industry and Company Affairs
1989: Re-elected to 9th Lok Sabha (3rd term)
1990-91: Member, Committee on Subordinate Legislation
Member, Consultative Committee, Ministry of Water Resources
Member, Political Affairs Committee, Congress Parliamentary Party (C.P.P.)
1991: Re-elected to 10th Lok Sabha (4th term)
1991-92: Union Cabinet Minister, Law, Justice and Company Affairs
1992-94: Member, Andhra Pradesh Legislative Assembly
1992-94: Chief Minister, Andhra Pradesh (2nd term)
1996: Re-elected to 11th Lok Sabha (5th term)
1996-97: Member, Committee on Transport and Tourism
1998: Re-elected to 12th Lok Sabha (6th term)
1998-99: Member, Committee on Transport and Tourism
Member, Rules Committee
Member, Consultative Committee, Ministry of Civil Aviation

References 

2001 deaths
1920 births
Telugu politicians
Chief Ministers of Andhra Pradesh
India MPs 1977–1979
India MPs 1980–1984
India MPs 1989–1991
India MPs 1991–1996
India MPs 1996–1997
India MPs 1998–1999
Members of the Andhra Pradesh Legislative Assembly
Members of the Andhra Pradesh Legislative Council
People from Kurnool district
Lok Sabha members from Andhra Pradesh
People from Rayalaseema
Andhra Pradesh district councillors
Chief ministers from Indian National Congress
Indian National Congress politicians from Andhra Pradesh
Commerce and Industry Ministers of India
Law Ministers of India
Members of the Cabinet of India